Mary O'Brien (fl. 1785-1790), was an Irish poet and playwright who wrote during and about the Regency period.

Biography

Very little is known about the personal life of Mary O'Brien except that she was the wife of Patrick O'Brien Esq. as she wrote both under her name and as Mrs Patrick O'Brien. She was in favour of Irish economic independence and an independent Irish parliament as well as being a supporter of Charles James Fox and Richard Brinsley Sheridan. She believed that George III should be replaced by a Regent while he was unwell. O'Brien hoped that this would also remove William Pitt from his position. Her work was considered satyrical and political. She wrote poetry and plays.

Bibliography
 The political monitor; or Regent's friend, (1790)
 The Fallen Patriot, (1794)
 Charles Henley
 The pious incendiaries, (1785)

References and sources

18th-century Irish people
19th-century Irish poets
19th-century Irish women writers
19th-century Irish writers
Irish women poets